Calosoma schayeri (green carab beetle or saffron beetle) is a species of Carabidae that occurs in Australia. Like most Carabidae the larvae is predaceous. It is quite active at night when it is found hunting for slow-moving prey such as caterpillars. If handled it gives off an unpleasant scent.

References

External links

schayeri
Beetles of Australia
Beetles described in 1842